Elections to city, county and district people's assemblies(시 ( 구역 ) · 군 인민회의 선거) were held in North Korea on November 24, 1991.

In total, 26,074 city, county, and district people's assembly deputies were elected. Voter turnout was reported as 99.89%, with candidates receiving a 100% approval rate.

References

1991 in North Korea
North Korea
Local elections in North Korea
November 1991 events in Asia